Born to the Wind is an American drama television series that aired on NBC from August 19, 1982, to September 5, 1982.

Synopsis
The series centered on a small Native American tribe in an unnamed part North American at the turn of the 19th century.

Cast

References

External links 

 

1980s American drama television series
1982 American television series debuts
1982 American television series endings
NBC original programming
English-language television shows